Percy Toone (27 July 1883 – 4 February 1955) was an English cricketer. He played for Essex between 1912 and 1922.

References

External links

1883 births
1955 deaths
English cricketers
Essex cricketers
Sportspeople from Colchester